

Fairview Cemetery is a 32-acre cemetery owned by the city of Colorado Springs, Colorado. A cemetery for area pioneers, the cemetery was founded in 1895 on the west side of the city, but there were earlier burials on the land. The land was donated by Anthony Bott in exchange for water rights. Bott was a founder of Colorado City, now known as Old Colorado City. It offers views of Garden of the Gods and Cheyenne Mountain. Buried in the cemetery are Anthony Bott, madam Laura Bell McDaniel, Civil War veterans, gold prospectors, and saloon keepers. There are up to 15,000 remains buried in the cemetery.

Notable people
 Louis Unser (1896–1979), an American auto racer

See also
 Evergreen Cemetery (Colorado Springs, Colorado)

References

External links
 Evergreen and Fairview Cemeteries, City of Colorado Springs
 Fairview Cemetery Crawl by Old Colorado City Historical Society volunteers, West Side Pioneer
 

1895 establishments in Colorado
Buildings and structures in Colorado Springs, Colorado